Derek John Walker (15 June 1929 – 11 May 2015) was a British architect primarily associated with urban planning and leisure facilities architecture, through his firm Derek Walker Associates.

Career
After completing his national service, Walker went on to study architecture at Leeds Art School; whilst there he met his first wife Jill Messenger. He then studied planning at the University of Pennsylvania before returning to the UK in 1960 to set up an architectural practice in Leeds.

From 1970 to 1976 Walker was Chief Architect and planner of the new town Milton Keynes. He recruited a team and over seven years produced a landscaping strategy for the 'new city', eleven village plans, the structure for the programme for producing 3000 houses per year with supporting community, leisure, retail and sporting and cultural facilities. 

Amongst his many buildings, possibly the most celebrated was the Central Milton Keynes Shopping Centre. The team for this complex included Stuart Mosscrop, Christopher Woodward and Syd Green. In July 2010, the building was recognised with a Grade II listing, to applause from the 20th Century Society and other conservationists.

In 1980 Walker was involved with Norman Foster and Frank Newby in a controversial scheme to expand the Whitney Museum in New York City using air rights purchased from nearby properties to build a mixed-use skyscraper which would include a new wing for the museum. When a furore developed, the museum denied it had solicited the team.

He ran the architecture course at the Royal College of Art between 1984 and 1990.

Walker was the architect for the Royal Armouries Museum in Leeds, a £42.5million project which opened to the public in 1996.

Academic Posts
Professor of Architecture and Design, Royal College of Art, London
Visiting Professor, University of California, Los Angeles
University of Southern California
University of Pennsylvania

Personal life 
Walker was born on 15 June 1929 in Blackburn, Lancashire, however he and his family moved to Leeds in West Yorkshire when he was very young. 

He was first married to the artist Jill Messenger; they had two sons. He was married secondly and his third wife was Eve Happold.

Walker was a lifelong sports fanatic with a passion for cricket, and was a supporter of Leeds United FC.

Notable projects

Derek Walker Associates
 Housing Association, Newton Garth, Leeds 1968/69
 Royal Armouries Museum, Leeds 1996
 Extensive renovations of the Happy Valley Racecourse in Hong Kong
 The Whitney Museum extension in New York, with Sir Norman Foster
 Kowloon Park Hong Kong including Olympic Pools, Sports hall, Piazza, Sculpture walk and Chinese garden
 New Equine Training Facility for Royal Hong Kong Jockey Club at Shatin
 Master Plan for New City of Jubail in Saudi Arabia
 The Lijnbaan covered Shopping Precinct, City of Rotterdam
 Central Business District for New City of Jubail, Saudi ArabiaMasterplan
 The Wonderworld Themepark and Related Industries proposal for a  site Corby
 Clarence DockMasterplan mixed-use development, Leeds
 Telluride Year Round Resort Masterplan Colorado USA
 Commodores Point mixed use Development and Marina, Jacksonville, FloridaMasterplan
 Museum of British Historya proposal for the St Bartholomew's Hospital site London
 UshikuMasterplan for a city of 100,000 people Ushiku, Japan
 "Xanadu"an unrealised  mixed use Leisure Development Rotherham Lancashire
 National Museum of the United States Army Washington DCConcept and Detailed Design
 "Golden Eye for Blackpool"a proposed Second Gateway Covered Leisure Facility and Mixed Use Development

Milton Keynes Development Corporation
 Central Milton Keynes Shopping Centre, Milton Keynes
 The City Park and Sculpture Park for Central Milton Keynes

Publications 
 The Great Engineers: The Art of British Engineers 1837–1987. .
 Happold: The Confidence to Build. .
 Animated Architecture.
 Derek Walker Associates "'The View from Great Linford' Monograph" 
 'Los Angeles Profile Architectural Design Magazine with USC 1982"
 Structural Engineering Design in Practice. With Roger Westbrook.
 The Royal Armouries The Making of a Museum. With Guy Wilson .
 New Towns (Architectural Design, No 111). With Maggie Toy.
 AD Milton keynes 1.2.3 Volumes Profiles Architectural Magazine 1973-4-5.
 The Architecture and Planning of Milton Keynes

References

External links
Milton Keynes City Discovery Centre
Living Archive Interview

 

1929 births
2015 deaths
20th-century English architects
People from Blackburn
Academics of the Royal College of Art
English urban planners
English architecture writers
Architects from Lancashire